Charles Plumptre was an Anglican priest during the mid 18th century.

Plumptre was educated at Queens' College, Cambridge. He held incumbencies at Harston,  Whaddon and Wimple before being appointed domestic chaplain to the Bishop of Oxford in 1745. He was appointed a prebendary of Norwich Cathedral in 1749; and Archdeacon of Ely in 1751: he was collated on 20 December and installed on 29 December that year. He died in post on 14 September 1779.

References

1779 deaths
Alumni of Queens' College, Cambridge
Archdeacons of Ely
Fellows of Queens' College, Cambridge